Shorter College may refer to:

Shorter College (Arkansas), a junior college in Little Rock, Arkansas
Shorter University, formerly known as Shorter College, a liberal arts college in Rome, Georgia